Frank Kjosås (born 28 July 1981) is a Norwegian actor of theatre and film, known for The Half Brother, and his role as Norwegian resistance soldier Knut Haukelid in The Heavy Water War.

Early life
Frank Kjosås was born in Øystese in Hardanger. He has two brothers and three sisters. He decided to become an actor aged 15, when he saw a production of Jesus Christ Superstar in Øystese. He attended Romerike Folk High School, Bårdar Dance Institute, and from 2003–2006, the Norwegian National Academy of Theatre.

Career
In his third year at the Norwegian National Academy of Theatre, he was cast in the role as Woof in the musical Hair by Det Norske Teatret, and has been permanently employed by the theatre ever since.
His had his first film role in 37 1/2 (2005), a comedy-drama, and got his big break in 2008 with House of Fools and Troubled Water. However, he was repeatedly told at the Norwegian National Academy of Theatre that, due to his small height (170 cm) and youthful, "feminine" features, he would be severely limited in the roles he could play. In order to counteract this, he sought darker, gritty parts; however, he still encountered difficulty getting varied roles due to what was termed his "androgynous" appearance, and it wasn't until 2013, when he played the starring role of Fred, a boxer, in The Half Brother (for which he received the Gullruten Award 2013 for Best Actor), that he was able to change his image. He currently alternates between theatre, film, musicals, and television.

Filmography

Theatre

Film & TV

External links

References

1981 births
Living people
People from Kvam
Oslo National Academy of the Arts alumni
21st-century Norwegian male actors
Norwegian male film actors
Norwegian male television actors
Norwegian male stage actors
Norwegian male musical theatre actors